Todd J. Leach is an American administrator and the Chancellor of the University System of New Hampshire, which consists of University of New Hampshire, Plymouth State University, Keene State College, and Granite State College.

Prior to serving as Chancellor, he was president of Granite State College where he introduced master's degrees and grew the college over 30% in three years while leading the college to a national ranking of 27 for online programs by U.S. News & World Report, as well as a ranking of 2nd in the nation on Washington Monthly Metric of Social Mobility.

Leach also serves on the USNH Board of Trustees and as a commissioner for the State of New Hampshire Post-Secondary Education Commission.  He has served as chair of the New England Board of Higher Education, the NH College and University Council, Campus Compact NH, and the NH Higher Education Commission.

Early life and education
Todd J. Leach graduated from Mass Bay Community College with an associate degree. He continued on to Worcester State College, graduating with a Bachelor of Science in 1983. Leach then attended Bentley University, where he earned his Master of Business Administration degree. Focusing on the changing competitive and political environment of higher education, Leach earned his PhD from Northeastern University.

Career
Leach began his career in academics as an associate professor at Lasell College from 1986 until 1996, where he served as the director of business programs and the director of the Yamawaki Program. In addition to his duties as director, he also served as chair of the faculty, chair of the curriculum committee, and Faculty Marshal.

Leach served in progressively higher-level leadership roles at Northeastern University, including Senior Associate Dean and Chief Academic Officer of the College of Professional Studies. While overseeing both graduate and undergraduate offerings and leading the development and implementation of more than twenty masters and doctorate degree programs, Leach oversaw Northeastern Online and served as Executive Director of Northeastern University's School of Education, growing graduate programs from less than 20 students to over 1,000 within 3 years.

In addition, Leach has designed curriculum for international programs in Australia and Singapore; served on numerous academic committees, including Northeastern's Graduate Council and undergraduate programs committee; has been quoted in regional and national publications; presented on topics in higher education at many national and international conferences; and was an opening panelist for the 2011 Summit on the Future of Online Learning.

Granite State College
Leach became the fourth president of Granite State College on July 1, 2010. Under his leadership, Granite State College and began launching a variety of exciting initiatives, aimed at advancing the college's mission and fueling growth.  Among these initiatives are the development of Granite State College's first-ever master's degree programs and the creation of the Office of Graduate Studies. As a result, Granite State College has achieved the highest enrollments in its history, and became the fastest-growing public four-year college in New England.

Awards and achievements
 Distinguished Alumni Award, Worcester State College, 2012
 Distinguished Alumni Award, Mass Bay Community College 2011
 Named award created - Todd J. Leach Innovative Leadership Award
 International Economic Honor Society member
 ACHE Innovative Program Award

References

External links
Granite State College

Living people
Northeastern University alumni
Bentley University alumni
Worcester State University alumni
University System of New Hampshire
Heads of universities and colleges in the United States
Year of birth missing (living people)
Lasell College faculty